The following is a list of United States ambassadors to Eritrea. The United States recognized Eritrea's independence April 27, 1991, and established diplomatic relations on June 11, 1991. The Consulate in Asmara then became an Embassy with Joseph P. O'Neill as Chargé d'Affaires ad interim. The U.S. embassy in Eritrea has been represented by a Chargé d'Affaires since 2010.

Ambassadors

See also
Eritrea – United States relations
Embassy of the United States, Asmara
Foreign relations of Eritrea
Ambassadors of the United States

References

United States Department of State: Background notes on Eritrea

External links
 United States Department of State: Chiefs of Mission for Eritrea
 United States Department of State: Eritrea
 United States Embassy in Asmara

Eritrea

United States